Ali Gholam (born 4 August 1981) is an Iranian footballer.

Club career
In July 2011, Gholam joined Rah Ahan.

References
Profile at Persianleague.com

1981 births
Living people
Paykan F.C. players
Rah Ahan players
Iranian footballers
Place of birth missing (living people)
Association football midfielders